Tash-Yelga (Taşyılğa) is a rural locality (a village) in Novoartaulsky Selsoviet, Yanaulsky District, Bashkortostan, Russia. The population was 79 as of 2010. There are 2 streets.

Geography 
Tash-Yelga is located 9 km north of Yanaul (the district's administrative centre) by road. Tatarskaya Urada is the nearest rural locality.

References 

Rural localities in Yanaulsky District